Litocheiridae is a family of crustaceans belonging to the order Decapoda.

Genera:
 Georgeoplax Türkay, 1983
 Gollincarcinus Beschin & De Angeli, 2004
 Lessinioplax Beschin & De Angeli, 2004
 Litocheira Kinahan, 1856
 Maingrapsus Tessier, Beschin, Busulini & De Angeli, 1999
 Paracorallicarcinus Tessier, Beschin, Busulini & De Angeli, 1999

References

Decapods
Decapod families